Manuel Göttsching (9 September 1952 – 4 December 2022) was a German musician and composer.

As the leader of the groups Ash Ra Tempel and Ashra in the 1970s and 80s, as well as a solo artist, he was one of the most influential guitarists of the Krautrock (also known as Kosmische Musik) genre. He also participated in the Cosmic Jokers sessions. His style and technique influenced dozens of artists in the post-Eno ambient and Berlin School of electronic music scenes in the 1980s and 1990s.

Early life 
As a child, Göttsching was exposed to the music of Verdi and Puccini by his mother, who was a fan of opera. He also listened to radio stations run by American and British allied forces. Too young for early rock and roll, it was not until the 1960s that Göttsching found the music that really inspired him such as Motown music from the United States, as well the Rolling Stones and British blues bands. Originally a classical guitarist, the music he heard inspired him to switch to the electric guitar.

In school, Göttsching played with a cover band. "We played some Rolling Stones, we played some Beatles, we played some Who, some what was the popular music and that was just for fun," he recalls.However upon hearing Blue Cheer's proto-metal cover of "Summertime Blues" and learning about the free jazz movement inspired Göttsching and his bandmates to pursue a freer, more improvisatory approach to music.

Ash Ra Tempel 
As Göttsching and his bandmates moved from song-based music to free improvisation,  Ash Ra Tempel was born in 1970. "We didn't play blues," Göttsching recalls. "We used some elements of it but tried to keep the freestyle of improvisation and using some blues themes."  Along with Göttsching, the group included  Klaus Schulze (who had just left Tangerine Dream) and Hartmut Enke. Just after Ash Ra Tempel released its self-titled debut album in 1971, Schulze left to pursue what became a successful solo career.

In 2000, Göttsching and Klaus Schulze released a studio album and a live album as Ash Ra Tempel. The live album was recorded as part of the Cornucopia concerts curated by Julian Cope at the Royal Festival Hall in London.

Death
Göttsching died on 4 December 2022, at the age of 70.

Discography

Solo 
 Inventions for Electric Guitar (1975)
 E2-E4 (1981, 1984)
 Dream & Desire (1977, 1991, 2019)
 Die Mulde (1981, 1997, 2004, 2005)
 Concert for Murnau (2005)
 Live at Mt.Fuji (2007)

As Ash Ra Tempel 
Ash Ra Tempel (1971)
Schwingungen (1972)
Seven Up (with Timothy Leary, 1973)
Join Inn (1973)
Starring Rosi (1973)
Le Berceau de Cristal (soundtrack) (1975)
Friendship (with Klaus Schulze, 2000)

As Ashra 
1976/1976 – New Age of Earth (re-released in 2008 under Gottsching's name)
1977/1977 – Blackouts (re-released in 2008 under Gottsching's name)
1979/1978 – Correlations (5 disc expanded edition (Correlations Complete) including The Making Of released in 2008)
1980/1979 – Belle Alliance (2 disc expanded edition (Belle Alliance Plus) released in 2008)
1990/1988 – Walkin' the Desert
1991/1985–1986 – Tropical Heat

References

External links 

1952 births
2022 deaths
German guitarists
German male guitarists
Musicians from Berlin